In nonlinear control, the technique of Lyapunov redesign refers to the design where a stabilizing state feedback controller can be constructed with knowledge of the Lyapunov function . Consider the system

A nominal model for this system can be written as

and the control law

stabilizes the system.

Further reading 
 

Nonlinear control